The World Hip Hop Dance Championship is an international hip-hop dance competition created in 2002 by Hip Hop International. Countries that have participated in the past include Dominican Republic, India, Greece, Cyprus, Chile, Italy, Mexico, France, Japan, Switzerland, Morocco, Philippines, United Kingdom, China, Canada, Germany, Australia, Ireland, Malaysia, Colombia, South Africa, Nigeria, New Zealand, Denmark, Spain, Russia, Portugal, Netherlands, Argentina, Brazil, Trinidad and Tobago, Poland, Uruguay, Thailand and the United States of America. There are five sections of competition: mega crews, which have no age limit, had anywhere between 10 and 40 members, hip-hop for adult (ages 18-older), varsity (ages 13–17), junior (ages 7–12) crews, and mini crews.  There are also battles in popping and locking for solo dancers, and breaking for adult crews.

In August 2015, new countries, Gabon, Panama and South Korea, Kenya, among others, participated for the first time, joining a record 3,000 contestants from 50 countries. 

Due to COVID, competitions were not held in 2020. In 2021, competitions were held virtually. In 2022, a new division of junior mega crew has been added.

Winners

References

Externallinkss 
Hip Hop International official website
Pacific Rim Video's HHI Coverage

Street dance competitions